Casey Toof is an American politician. He serves as a Republican member for the Franklin-3-1 district of the Vermont House of Representatives.

Life and career 
Toof was born in St. Albans, Vermont. He attended St. Albans City Elementary School, Bellows Free Academy, and Castleton University, where he earned a degree in history and education.

In 2019, Toof was elected to represent the Franklin-3-1 district of the Vermont House of Representatives, succeeding Corey Parent. In 2022 he was elected to represent the Franklin-8 district.

References 

Living people
Year of birth missing (living people)
People from St. Albans, Vermont
Republican Party members of the Vermont House of Representatives
21st-century American politicians
Castleton State College alumni